Gennaro Portanova  (born 11 October 1845 in Naples, Italy, died 25 April 1908 in Reggio Calabria) was a cardinal of the Catholic Church, and was bishop of Ischia after the large earthquake there, and later archbishop of Reggio Calabria 1888–1908.

He was made a cardinal in 1899 by Pope Leo XIII. He took part in the 1903 conclave which elected Pope Pius X.

References

Sources

Roman Catholic archbishops in Italy
Bishops in Campania
Bishops in Calabria
20th-century Italian cardinals
Cardinals created by Pope Leo XIII
1845 births
1908 deaths
20th-century Italian Roman Catholic archbishops